Plesiophysa is a genus of gastropods in the family Bulinidae.

Species
Plesiophysa dolichomastix Paraense, 2002
Plesiophysa granulata (Sowerby, 1873)
Plesiophysa guadeloupensis Mazé, 1883
Plesiophysa hubendicki Richards & Ferguson, 1962
Plesiophysa pilsbryi Aguayo, 1935

References

Bulinidae
Gastropod genera